Romania competed at the 1968 Winter Olympics in Grenoble, France.  The two-man bobsleigh team of Nicolae Neagoe and Ion Panţuru won the nation's first medal at the Winter Games, a bronze. As of the 2018 games, they remain Romania's only Winter Olympic medalists.

Medalists

Alpine skiing

Men

Men's slalom

Biathlon

Men

 1 One minute added per close miss (a hit in the outer ring), two minutes added per complete miss.

Men's 4 x 7.5 km relay

 2 A penalty loop of 200 metres had to be skied per missed target.

Bobsleigh

Figure skating

Women

Ice hockey

First round
  West Germany -  Romania  7:0 (1:0, 3:0, 3:0) 
Goalscorers: Gustav Hanig 2, Alois Schloder, Ernst Kopf, Otto Schneitberger, Horst Meindl, Heinz Weisenbach.

Consolation Round 
Teams in this group play for 9th-14th places.

 Romania –  Austria 3:2 (2:1, 1:1, 0:0)
Goalscorers: Fagarasi, Calamar, Mois – Schupp, Samonig.

 France –  Romania 3:7 (0:2, 0:2, 3:3)
Goalscorers: Itzicsohn, Mazza, Lacarriere – Iuliu Szabo 2, Florescu 2, Pana, Geza Szabo, Stefan.

 Japan –  Romania 5:4 (3:0, 1:3, 1:1)
Goalscorers: Hikigi 2, Araki, Itoh, Kudo – Florescu, Pana, Mois, Ionescu.

  Norway –  Romania 4:3 (2:2, 1:1, 1:0)
Goalscorers: Bergeid, Olsen, Syversen, Mikkelsen – Pana, Iuliu Szabo, Czaka.

 Yugoslavia –  Romania 9:5 (5:3, 1:1, 3:1)
Goalscorers: Roman Smolej 2, Tisler 2, Felc 2, Ivo Jan, Hiti, Jug – Iuliu Szabo 2, Tekei, Florescu, Geza Szabo.

Contestants
12. ROMANIA
Goaltenders: Constantin Dumitras, Mihai Stoiculescu
Defence: Ion Stefan Ionescu, Zoltan Czaka, Dezideriu Varga, Zoltan Fogaras, Razvan Schiau
Forwards: Geza Szabo, Iulian Florescu, Alexandru Kalamar, Gyula Szabo, Eduard Pana, Ion Gheorghiu, Stefan Texe, Ion Basa, Aurel Mois, Valentin Stefanov

References
Official Olympic Reports 
International Olympic Committee results database
 Olympic Winter Games 1968, full results by sports-reference.com

Nations at the 1968 Winter Olympics
1968
1968 in Romanian sport